DCT is a digital recording component video videocassette format developed and introduced by Ampex in 1992.  It was based on the D1 format, and unlike the uncompressed recording scheme of D1, it was the first digital videotape format to use data compression.  Like D1 (and D2), it uses a similar cassette loaded with 3/4" (19mm) width tape.

One of the models of VCR released for the format was the Ampex DCT-1700D.

The type of data compression used by the format, discrete cosine transform (DCT), shares the same acronym as the format, but the meaning is different for the latter (the format's acronym meaning Data Component Technology).

DST (Data Storage Technology), a data-only version of DCT, was also developed by Ampex at the same time for the backup and archiving of data from servers and other enterprise-oriented IT systems.

References

External links
 Cutaway view of a DCT VCR
 Encyclopedia Pro's entry on DCT
 Ampex's History

Videotape